The 2019-20 Northeastern Huskies Men's ice hockey season was the 88th season of play for the program and the 36th season in the Hockey East conference. The Huskies represented Northeastern University and were coached by Jim Madigan, in his 9th season.

The Hockey East tournament as well as the NCAA Tournament were cancelled due to the COVID-19 pandemic before any games were played.

Roster
As of June 28, 2019.

Standings

Schedule and Results

|-
!colspan=12 style=";" | Regular Season

|-
!colspan=12 style=";" | 

|- 
!colspan=12 style=";" | 

|- 
!colspan=12 style=";" | 
|- align="center" bgcolor="#e0e0e0"
|colspan=12|Tournament Cancelled

Scoring Statistics

Goaltending statistics

Rankings

Players drafted into the NHL

2020 NHL Entry Draft

† incoming freshman

References

2019–20
Northeastern Huskies 
Northeastern Huskies 
2019 in sports in Massachusetts
2020 in sports in Massachusetts